Cividate Camuno  is an Italian comune of 2,774 inhabitants (2011), in Val Camonica, province of Brescia, in Lombardy.

Geography
The territory of Cividate Camuno is bordered by several municipalities: to the east Bienno, on the north Breno and Malegno, to the west Piancogno, and south Esine and Berzo Inferiore.

History

Originally a Roman town, the Civitas Camunnorum, Cividate Camuno was known as Civethate in the medieval period.

Between 1863 and 1887 Cividate assumed the name "Cividate Alpino", but because of bureaucratic confusion, in 1887 the village re-took the name "Cividate Camuno" .

Main sights
The main tourist sights of Cividate Camuno are:
 Parish Church of Santa Maria Assunta, standing on the site of the baptismal chapel dedicated to St. John the Baptist, which was replaced after the 11th century by the  Romanesque church. 
 Church of Santo Stefano. Commanding the countryside, it is accessed by a ladder with four flights with no other possibility of approach (the ladder is dated 1770). Archaeological excavations have reported pre-Christian elements. 
 Medieval tower of the 12th-13th century
 Renaissance gates
 Museo nazionale della Valcamonica
 The Roman park of the theatre and amphitheatre

Culture
The scütüm are in camunian dialect nicknames, sometimes personal, elsewhere showing the characteristic features of a community.  The one which characterize the people of Cividate Camuno is Pàtate, Bö or Maia Hüche.

People
 Blessed Giuseppe Tovini
 Blessed Mosè Tovini

References

External links
 
Historical photos - Intercam  
Historical photos - Lombardia Beni Culturali  
 Archaeological park with Roman theatre and amphitheatre and national museum 

Cities and towns in Lombardy